School of Military Aeronautics may refer to:

No 1 School of Military Aeronautics
United States School of Military Aeronautics at the University of Illinois at Urbana–Champaign
School of Military Aeronautics at Cornell University
School of Military Aeronautics at University of California, Berkeley
School of Military Aeronautics at Princeton University